The Philippines men's national wheelchair basketball team is the wheelchair basketball side that represents Philippines in international competitions for men as part of the International Wheelchair Basketball Federation.

History
The Philippines already has a national wheelchair basketball team as early as the 2000s. The country's national team which was directly under the auspices of the Philippine Sports Association for the Differently Abled—National Paralympic Committee (PHILSPADA-NPC) competed in the inaugural edition of the ASEAN Wheelchair Basketball Championship in 2003 where it had a second-place finish.

The Philippines has also competed in the ASEAN Para Games in some occasions, having cliched the silver medal at the 2005 ASEAN Para Games. and settling for bronze in the 2014 and 2015 editions.

The Wheelchair Basketball Federation of the Philippines was established in 2019 as part of the Philippine Paralympic Committee's plan to have a National Para-Sport Associations (NPSAs) for parasports, or the equivalent of the National Sport Associations (NSAs) of the Philippine Olympic Committee which handles abled-bodied sports. The Philippine national team went in Thailand to compete in the Asia-Oceania qualifiers for the 2020 Summer Paralympics using wheelchair bought days prior to the tournament. They planned to compete in the 2020 ASEAN Para Games at home which was later cancelled due to the COVID-19 pandemic. In the 2022 edition, they clinched a silver medal.

Current roster
The team's current roster as of the 2015 ASEAN Para Games

Head coach:  Vernon Perea
Assistant coach:  Harry Solanoy

Competitions

The Philippines men team has not competed at the Wheelchair Basketball World Championship or at the Summer Paralympics.

Paralympics

Asia-Oceania Championship

Asian Para Games

ASEAN Para Games

ASEAN Championship

Other

References

National men's wheelchair basketball teams
Wheelchair basketball
Wheelchair basketball
wheel
Wheelchair basketball in the Philippines